Cross (stylized as †; titled Justice on digital platforms) is the debut studio album by French electronic music duo Justice. It was first released digitally on 11 June 2007, and later on 18 June through Ed Banger Records and Because Music in most countries and Vice Records in the United States.

Recorded during 2005 and 2006 in Paris, Cross was composed as an "opera-disco" album. It features many samples and "microsamples" throughout, with about 400 albums being used as sampled material. The song "D.A.N.C.E." is a tribute to Michael Jackson. French musician Mehdi Pinson appears on "DVNO", and vocalist Uffie appears on "Tthhee Ppaarrttyy". The album was supported by the singles "Waters of Nazareth", "D.A.N.C.E.", "DVNO", "Phantom Pt. II", and "Tthhee Ppaarrttyy". A controversial music video was also released for "Stress".

Cross received critical acclaim and was a commercial success, reaching number 11 on the French albums chart and number one on the UK and US dance album charts. The album was nominated for Best Electronic/Dance Album and "D.A.N.C.E." was nominated for Best Dance Recording and Best Video at the 50th Annual Grammy Awards. Cross was later certified gold in the UK on 9 December 2011, for passing shipments of 100,000 copies. As of 2011, sales in the United States have exceeded 134,000 copies, according to Nielsen SoundScan. In 2012 it was awarded a diamond certification from the Independent Music Companies Association which indicated sales of at least 200,000 copies throughout Europe.

Background and promotion
Cross was recorded in Paris during 2005 and 2006. The concept for the album was for it to be an "opera-disco" album. Xavier de Rosnay stated about the opera disco concept: 

Two songs were released as singles before the album's release. "Waters of Nazareth" was the first single released by the group in 2005 and featured "Let There Be Light" as its B-side. "D.A.N.C.E." was the second single from the album released on 23 April 2007. The single also featured the song "Phantom", which was also released on the Ed Rec Vol. 2 compilation album prior to the release of this album. The song "D.A.N.C.E." is about and dedicated to Michael Jackson. A music video for the song "Stress", directed by Romain Gavras, was released on 1 May 2008 through the website of rapper Kanye West. It was subject to heavy criticism upon release and received a ban from French television due to its violent content.

There are three credited samples present on the album: "You Make Me Wanna Wiggle" by The Brothers Johnson was sampled for "Newjack", "Tenebre (main theme)" by Simonetti-Morante-Pignatelli was sampled for "Phantom" and "Phantom Pt. II", and "Night on Disco Mountain" by David Shire was sampled for "Stress". However, it also incorporates unrecognisable "microsamples" from hundreds of albums. De Rosnay stated: 

In August 2018 Nike, Inc. used the track "Genesis" in an advertisement for the launch of a football boot.

Reception

Cross was released to critical acclaim. On Metacritic, which assigns a weighted average score out of 100 to reviews and ratings from mainstream critics, the album received a metascore of 81 based on 25 reviews, which indicates "universal acclaim". Rob Sheffield of Rolling Stone stated that "with loads of melodrama and not a moment of subtlety, Justice define the new-jacques swing." Jess Harvell of Pitchfork called the album a "harsh and mostly instrumental set that nonetheless plays like the ideal crossover electronic-pop record", noting that "Justice knows how to sequence a dance album to avoid drag and boredom." Michaelangelo Matos of The A.V. Club described it as "an engaging study in contrasts and a killer party record." MSN Music critic Robert Christgau gave the album a two-star honorable mention rating, indicating a "likable effort consumers attuned to its overriding aesthetic or individual vision may well enjoy". Christgau stated: "As dance music, not my idea of a good time, but as electronic pop, so much trickier, sillier and more kinetic than Kraftwerk."

At the 50th Grammy Awards, Cross was nominated for Best Electronic/Dance Album, while "D.A.N.C.E." was nominated for Best Dance Recording and Best Video. The album was also nominated for the 2007 Shortlist Prize, eventually losing out to The Reminder by Feist. Cross was ranked at second place by Planet Sound in their Best Albums of 2007 list. Pitchfork placed Cross at number 15 on their Top 50 Albums of 2007 list, as well as at number 107 on their list of the top 200 albums of the 2000s. Rolling Stone ranked it at number 24 on their list of the 30 Greatest EDM Albums of All Time. The album has been included in the book compilation 1001 Albums You Must Hear Before You Die.

In October 2020, EDM artist Zedd stated "if there was ever one album I would recommend combining production and musicality; it would be Justice's Cross. I still feel it sounds better than most electronic made today."

Track listing

Chart performance

Weekly charts

Year-end charts

Certifications

References

External links
 

2007 debut albums
Justice (band) albums
Ed Banger Records albums